The Peugeot 108 is a city car launched by French manufacturer Peugeot in March 2014 at the Geneva Motor Show. The 108 is related to the Citroën C1 and Toyota Aygo, and shares their floorpan, engines, transmission and electrics. Sales commenced in June 2014 in Mainland Europe and in July 2014 in the United Kingdom.

The model, along with the Citroën C1, was phased out on January 1, 2021, when Toyota took full ownership of the plant in the Czech Republic, and announced the model would not be renewed. Production ended without any direct successor. The cars were all built in the TPCA factory in the Czech Republic for nearly seven years.

Overview 

Peugeot introduced an updated interior in the spring of 2018 with new seat upholstery. There were no exterior changes.

Discontinuation 

The next generation 108, together with the Citroën C1, was planned to be released in March 2021 based on the TNGA-B platform, but the plan was cancelled.

In 2018, it was reported that the model, along with the Citroën C1, would be phased out by 2021, when Toyota took full ownership of the plant in the Czech Republic, and the model would not be renewed.

Sales

References

External links 

108
Cars introduced in 2014
City cars
2010s cars